The Ultimate Addiction (Chinese: 點金勝手) is a 30-episode Hong Kong television drama that is produced by Chong Wai-kin for TVB. The story centers on a group of individuals working in Hong Kong's financial world and stock market. It stars Bosco Wong, Kate Tsui and Nancy Wu as the main leads. A costume fitting was held on 21 August 2013 at Tseung Kwan O TVB City Studio Four at 12:30PM.

When Heaven Burns in 2011.

Development and casting
In late June 2013, TVB announced that the studios were preparing for a new drama that was "tailor-made" for Michael Miu, which he later confirmed. The following week, Bosco Wong and Sharon Chan were confirmed to star. In July 2013, Nancy Wu joined the cast, followed by Kate Tsui, Ben Wong, and Elena Kong.

On August 6, 2013, Miu dropped out due to unforeseen schedule conflicts. His role would not be replaced, and Bosco Wong would be leading from start to finish. On 10 August, Fred Cheng was confirmed to have joined the project, but left the cast in October 2013 due to his involvement in singing competition, Voice of Stars.

Synopsis
Cheuk Yuk (Bosco Wong)is a major figure in the financial industry who has no problems with crossing boundaries and playing dirty tricks for his own benefits. For this, he has long been a target of the Commercial Crime Bureau. Cheuk Yuk is much obsessed in the game of money and power, such that he neglects his family and friends. His wife and master have successively died because of him; however, he still felt no remorse, and instead, his ways have even worsened. Cheuk Yuk's brother-in-law, Chow San Yung (Ben Wong), being a member of the CCB, vows to have Cheuk Yuk prosecuted and brought to justice. His senior Ho Seung Yi (Sharon Chan) and subordinate Chi Nga (Kate Tsui) also work together with him to collect evidence. San Yung, at first, had high hopes for Chi Nga and even views her as his apprentice; however, Chi Nga suddenly resigns from her position as a CCB member and joins Cheuk Yuk's company. She first gains the trust of Cheuk Yuk's second wife, Fong Ming Yu (Nancy Wu) and then assists Cheuk Yuk to battle the female tycoon of the financial industry, Chai Pui Fan (Elena Kong). Eventually, Chi Nga seems to have the entire situation under her control, and even Cheuk Yuk's fiery ambition appears to have been engulfed. In the battlefield of the financial industry, where there is countless bloodshed and slaughtering, who will decide the final victory?

Cast and characters

The Cheuk Family

The Ho Family

Commercial Crime Bureau (CCB)

Others

Viewership ratings

International broadcast
  - 8TV (Malaysia) begins 6 September 2016.
  - Mediacorp Channel U (debut 19 January 2017)

References

External links
K-TVB.net
The Ultimate Addiction Official Website

TVB dramas
Hong Kong drama television series
Television series set in the 2010s
2014 Hong Kong television series debuts
2014 Hong Kong television series endings
Television censorship in China
Censored television series
Works banned in China